Qara Qayeh (also Romanized as Qarā Qayeh; also known as Qarah Qayeh and Qareh Qayeh) is a village in Ijrud-e Pain Rural District, Halab District, Ijrud County, Zanjan Province, Iran. At the 2006 census, its population was 104, in 23 families.

References 

Populated places in Ijrud County